The Humanitarian Forum is an international network of NGOs, bringing together both Muslim and Western charities.

The Humanitarian Forum was founded by Dr Hany El Banna in 2005 and is registered in UK as a charity.

The goal of the Humanitarian Forum is to help create a conducive, unbiased and safe environment for the implementation of technically sound and principled humanitarian action by;

- providing a platform for dialogue, 

- promoting mutual understanding, 

- supporting capacity building and development of NGOs and charities, 

- advocating for a legal framework for greater transparency and accountability, 

- promoting humanitarian principles and standards and 

- improving communication and co-operation 
 
Dr. Hany El Banna, founder of Islamic Relief and chairman of the Muslim Charities Forum, is the president of The Humanitarian Forum.

References

Organizations established in 2005
Charities based in London
Islamic charities based in the United Kingdom